Charles or Charlie Wade may refer to:
Charles Wade (1863–1922), Premier of New South Wales (1907–10)
Charles Paget Wade (1883–1956), English architect and artist
Charlie Wade (born 1963), American volleyball coach
Charlie Wade (American football) (born 1950), American football wide receiver